Walter Miller (June 1882 – 1928) was an English footballer who played as a forward for Sheffield Wednesday, West Ham United, Blackpool and Lincoln City, amongst other clubs.

Miller joined Southern League club West Ham United for the 1908–09 season and scored in his second outing for the club. He was an ever-present during that season's FA Cup run, which culminated in defeat at Newcastle United in a third-round replay on 24 February 1909.

In 1909–10, he finished as top scorer for Blackpool in his first season with the club, with fourteen goals in all competitions.

References

1928 deaths
Date of birth missing
1882 births
Place of death missing
Association football forwards
Blackpool F.C. players
Dundee F.C. players
English footballers
English Football League players
Lincoln City F.C. players
Merthyr Town F.C. players
Sheffield Wednesday F.C. players
Southern Football League players
Footballers from Newcastle upon Tyne
Third Lanark A.C. players
West Ham United F.C. players
Scottish Football League players